Arthur William McLeod was a member of the Wisconsin State Assembly.

Biography
McLeod was born on September 26, 1872, in Alpena, Michigan. He moved to Eagle River, Wisconsin in 1888. In 1894, he graduated from the University of Wisconsin Law School and settled in Washburn, Wisconsin.

Career
McLeod was a member of the Assembly in 1899. Previously, he had been City Attorney of Washburn from 1895 to 1896 and District Attorney of Bayfield County, Wisconsin from 1897 to 1898. He was a Republican.

References

People from Alpena, Michigan
People from Eagle River, Wisconsin
People from Washburn, Wisconsin
Republican Party members of the Wisconsin State Assembly
District attorneys in Wisconsin
Wisconsin city attorneys
University of Wisconsin Law School alumni
1872 births
Year of death missing
19th-century American politicians
19th-century American lawyers